René Vigliani (born 24 July 1929) is a French former football referee.

Career 
Vigliani was member of FIFA from 1967 to 1978, and refereed 7 international matches. He officiated 2 matches in Euro 1976 qualifying and 5 friendly matches. He also refereed a match in the 1978 U21 Euro. 
 
In club football, Vigliani officiated some UEFA competition matches for a total of 1 Champions League game, 12 UEFA Cup games, and 3 Cup Winners' Cup games. He refereed 259 French Division 1 matches from 1965 to 1980, and also officiated the 1971 Coupe de France Final.

Controversies 
There were two notable controversial decisions made by Vigliani during his career; one was in the first leg of the 1975–76 UEFA Cup quarter-final match-up between AC Milan and Club Brugge, which Milan won 2–1. The other one was during a French Division 1 match.

References and notes

External links  
 René Vigliani at WorldReferee.com
 René Vigliani at FootballFacts.ru (in Russian)
 

1929 births
Living people
French football referees
People from Arles
UEFA Champions League referees
UEFA Europa League referees
Sportspeople from Bouches-du-Rhône